The Freedom Area School District is a small, rural, public school district in Beaver County, Pennsylvania, USA. It serves the boroughs of Freedom, Conway, and the township of New Sewickley. According to 2000 federal census data, it has a resident population of 11,129 people. In 2009, the district residents’ per capita income was $17,961, while the median family income was $46,125. In the Commonwealth, the median family income was $49,501 and the United States median family income was $49,445, in 2010.

The district operates three schools: Freedom Area High School (9th–12th), Freedom Area Middle School (5th–8th), and Freedom Area Elementary School (K-4th).

References

School districts in Beaver County, Pennsylvania
Education in Pittsburgh area